Phytoremediation  technologies use living plants to clean up soil, air and water contaminated with hazardous contaminants. It is defined as "the use of green plants and the associated microorganisms, along with proper soil amendments and agronomic techniques to either contain, remove or render toxic environmental contaminants harmless". The term is an amalgam of the Greek phyto (plant) and Latin remedium (restoring balance). Although attractive for its cost, phytoremediation has not been demonstrated to redress any significant environmental challenge to the extent that contaminated space has been reclaimed.

Phytoremediation is proposed as a cost-effective plant-based approach of environmental remediation that takes advantage of the ability of plants to concentrate elements and compounds from the environment and to detoxify various compounds. The concentrating effect results from the ability of certain plants called hyperaccumulators to bioaccumulate chemicals. The remediation effect is quite different. Toxic heavy metals cannot be degraded, but organic pollutants can be, and are generally the major targets for phytoremediation. Several field trials confirmed the feasibility of using plants for environmental cleanup.

Background

Other methods of soil remediation are very expensive because they require a much more complicated process. The contaminated soil would need to be removed, sent to a laboratory to be cleansed of the toxic metals and then brought back to the site from which it was extracted. Phytoremediation is a more cost effective solution. Phytoremediation may be applied to polluted soil or static water environment. This technology has been increasingly investigated and employed at sites with soils contaminated heavy metals like with cadmium, lead, aluminum, arsenic and antimony. These metals can cause oxidative stress in plants, destroy cell membrane integrity, interfere with nutrient uptake, inhibit photosynthesis and decrease plant chlorophyll.

Phytoremediation has been used successfully include the restoration of abandoned metal mine workings, and sites where polychlorinated biphenyls have been dumped during manufacture and mitigation of ongoing coal mine discharges reducing the impact of contaminants in soils, water, or air. Contaminants such as metals, pesticides, solvents, explosives, and crude oil and its derivatives, have been mitigated in phytoremediation projects worldwide. Many plants such as mustard plants, alpine pennycress, hemp, and pigweed have proven to be successful at hyperaccumulating contaminants at toxic waste sites.

Not all plants are able to accumulate heavy metals or organics pollutants due to differences in the physiology of the plant. Even cultivars within the same species have varying abilities to accumulate pollutants.

Advantages and limitations

Advantages:
 the cost of the phytoremediation is lower than that of traditional processes both in situ and ex situ
 the possibility of the recovery and re-use of valuable metals (by companies specializing in "phyto mining")
 it preserves the topsoil, maintaining the fertility of the soil
 Increase soil health, yield, and plant phytochemicals 
 the use of plants also reduces erosion and metal leaching in the soil
Limitations:
 phytoremediation is limited to the surface area and depth occupied by the roots.
 with plant-based systems of remediation, it is not possible to completely prevent the leaching of contaminants into the groundwater (without the complete removal of the contaminated ground, which in itself does not resolve the problem of contamination)
 the survival of the plants is affected by the toxicity of the contaminated land and the general condition of the soil
 bio-accumulation of contaminants, especially metals, into the plants can affect consumer products like food and cosmetics, and requires the safe disposal of the affected plant material
 when taking up heavy metals, sometimes the metal is bound to the soil organic matter, which makes it unavailable for the plant to extract

Processes 

A range of processes mediated by plants or algae are tested in treating environmental problems.:

Phytoextraction 

Phytoextraction (or phytoaccumulation or phytosequestration) exploits the ability of plants or algae to remove contaminants from soil or water into harvestable plant biomass. It is also used for the mining of metals such as copper(II) compounds. The roots take up substances from the soil or water and concentrate them above ground in the plant biomass Organisms that can uptake high amounts of contaminants are called hyperaccumulators. Phytoextraction can also be performed by plants (e.g. Populus and Salix) that take up lower levels of pollutants, but due to their high growth rate and biomass production, may remove a considerable amount of contaminants from the soil. Phytoextraction has been growing rapidly in popularity worldwide for the last twenty years or so. Typically, phytoextraction is used for heavy metals or other inorganics. At the time of disposal, contaminants are typically concentrated in the much smaller volume of the plant matter than in the initially contaminated soil or sediment. After harvest, a lower level of the contaminant will remain in the soil, so the growth/harvest cycle must usually be repeated through several crops to achieve a significant cleanup. After the process, the soil is remediated. 

Of course many pollutants kill plants, so phytoremediation is not a panacea. For example, chromium is toxic to most higher plants at concentrations above 100 μM·kg−1 dry weight.

Mining of these extracted metals through phytomining is a conceivable way of recovering the material. Hyperaccumulating plants are often metallophyte. Induced or assisted phytoextraction is a process where a conditioning fluid containing a chelator or another agent is added to soil to increase metal solubility or mobilization so that the plants can absorb them more easily. While such additives can increase metal uptake by plants, they can also lead to large amounts of available metals in the soil beyond what the plants are able to translocate, causing potential leaching into the subsoil or groundwater.

Examples of plants that are known to accumulate the following contaminants:
Arsenic, using the sunflower (Helianthus annuus), or the Chinese Brake fern (Pteris vittata).
Cadmium, using willow (Salix viminalis): In 1999, one research experiment performed by Maria Greger and Tommy Landberg suggested willow has a significant potential as a phytoextractor of cadmium (Cd), zinc (Zn), and copper (Cu), as willow has some specific characteristics like high transport capacity of heavy metals from root to shoot and huge amount of biomass production; can be used also for production of bio energy in the biomass energy power plant.
Cadmium and zinc, using alpine pennycress (Thlaspi caerulescens), a hyperaccumulator of these metals at levels that would be toxic to many plants. Specifically, pennycress leaves accumulate up to 380 mg/kg Cd. On the other hand, the presence of copper seems to impair its growth (see table for reference).
Chromium is toxic to most plants. However, tomatoes (Solanum lycopersicum) show some promise.
Lead, using Indian mustard (Brassica juncea), ragweed (Ambrosia artemisiifolia), hemp dogbane (Apocynum cannabinum), or poplar trees, which sequester lead in their biomass.
Salt-tolerant (moderately halophytic) barley and/or sugar beets are commonly used for the extraction of sodium chloride (common salt) to reclaim fields that were previously flooded by sea water.
Caesium-137 and strontium-90 were removed from a pond using sunflowers after the Chernobyl accident.
Mercury, selenium and organic pollutants such as polychlorinated biphenyls (PCBs) have been removed from soils by transgenic plants containing genes for bacterial enzymes.

Phytostabilization 
Phytostabilization reduces the mobility of substances in the environment, for example, by limiting the leaching of substances from the soil. It focuses on the long term stabilization and containment of the pollutant. The plant immobilizes the pollutants by binding them to soil particles making them less available for plant or human uptake. Unlike phytoextraction, phytostabilization focuses mainly on sequestering pollutants in soil near the roots but not in plant tissues. Pollutants become less bioavailable, resulting in reduced exposure. The plants can also excrete a substance that produces a chemical reaction, converting the heavy metal pollutant into a less toxic form. Stabilization results in reduced erosion, runoff, leaching, in addition to reducing the bioavailability of the contaminant. An example application of phytostabilization is using a vegetative cap to stabilize and contain mine tailings. Some soil amendments decrease radiosource mobility – while at some concentrations the same amendments will increase mobility. Vidal et al. 2000 find the root mats of meadow grasses are effective at demobilising radiosource materials especially with certain combinations of other agricultural practices. Vidal also find that the particular grass mix makes a significant difference.

Phytodegradation 

Phytodegradation (also called phytotransformation) uses plants or microorganisms to degrade organic pollutants in the soil or within the body of the plant. The organic compounds are broken down by enzymes that the plant roots secrete and these molecules are then taken up by the plant and released through transpiration. This process works best with organic contaminants like herbicides, trichloroethylene, and methyl tert-butyl ether.

Phytotransformation results in the chemical modification of environmental substances as a direct result of plant metabolism, often resulting in their inactivation, degradation (phytodegradation), or immobilization (phytostabilization). In the case of organic pollutants, such as pesticides, explosives, solvents, industrial chemicals, and other xenobiotic substances, certain plants, such as Cannas, render these substances non-toxic by their metabolism.  In other cases, microorganisms living in association with plant roots may metabolize these substances in soil or water. These complex and recalcitrant compounds cannot be broken down to basic molecules (water, carbon-dioxide, etc.) by plant molecules, and, hence, the term phytotransformation represents a change in chemical structure without complete breakdown of the compound.
The term "Green Liver" is used to describe phytotransformation, as plants behave analogously to the human liver when dealing with these xenobiotic compounds (foreign compound/pollutant). After uptake of the xenobiotics, plant enzymes increase the polarity of the xenobiotics by adding functional groups such as hydroxyl groups (-OH).

This is known as Phase I metabolism, similar to the way that the human liver increases the polarity of drugs and foreign compounds (drug metabolism). Whereas in the human liver enzymes such as cytochrome P450s are responsible for the initial reactions, in plants enzymes such as peroxidases, phenoloxidases, esterases and nitroreductases carry out the same role.

In the second stage of phytotransformation, known as Phase II metabolism, plant biomolecules such as glucose and amino acids are added to the polarized xenobiotic to further increase the polarity (known as conjugation). This is again similar to the processes occurring in the human liver where glucuronidation (addition of glucose molecules by the UGT class of enzymes, e.g. UGT1A1) and glutathione addition reactions occur on reactive centres of the xenobiotic.

Phase I and II reactions serve to increase the polarity and reduce the toxicity of the compounds, although many exceptions to the rule are seen. The increased polarity also allows for easy transport of the xenobiotic along aqueous channels.

In the final stage of phytotransformation (Phase III metabolism), a sequestration of the xenobiotic occurs within the plant. The xenobiotics polymerize in a lignin-like manner and develop a complex structure that is sequestered in the plant. This ensures that the xenobiotic is safely stored, and does not affect the functioning of the plant. However, preliminary studies have shown that these plants can be toxic to small animals (such as snails), and, hence, plants involved in phytotransformation may need to be maintained in a closed enclosure.

Hence, the plants reduce toxicity (with exceptions) and sequester the xenobiotics in phytotransformation. Trinitrotoluene phytotransformation has been extensively researched and a transformation pathway has been proposed.

Phytostimulation 
Phytostimulation (or rhizodegradation) is the enhancement of soil microbial activity for the degradation of organic contaminants, typically by organisms that associate with roots. This process occurs within the rhizosphere, which is the layer of soil that surrounds the roots. Plants release carbohydrates and acids that stimulate microorganism activity which results in the biodegradation of the organic contaminants. This means that the microorganisms are able to digest and break down the toxic substances into harmless form. Phytostimulation has been shown to be effective in degrading petroleum hydrocarbons, PCBs, and PAHs. Phytostimulation can also involve aquatic plants supporting active populations of microbial degraders, as in the stimulation of atrazine degradation by hornwort.

Phytovolatilization 

Phytovolatilization is the removal of substances from soil or water with release into the air, sometimes as a result of phytotransformation to more volatile and/or less polluting substances. In this process, contaminants are taken up by the plant and through transpiration, evaporate into the atmosphere. This is the most studied form of phytovolatilization, where volatilization occurs at the stem and leaves of the plant, however indirect phytovolatilization occurs when contaminants are volatilized from the root zone. Selenium (Se) and Mercury (Hg) are often removed from soil through phytovolatilization. Poplar trees are one of the most successful plants for removing VOCs through this process due to its high transpiration rate.

Rhizofiltration 
Rhizofiltration is a process that filters water through a mass of roots to remove toxic substances or excess nutrients. The pollutants remain absorbed in or adsorbed to the roots. This process is often used to clean up contaminated groundwater through planting directly in the contaminated site or through removing the contaminated water and providing it to these plants in an off-site location. In either case though, typically plants are first grown in a greenhouse under precise conditions.

Biological hydraulic containment 
Biological hydraulic containment occurs when some plants, like poplars, draw water upwards through the soil into the roots and out through the plant, which decreases the movement of soluble contaminants downwards, deeper into the site and into the groundwater.

Phytodesalination 
Phytodesalination uses halophytes (plants adapted to saline soil) to extract salt from the soil to improve its fertility.

Role of genetics 
Breeding programs and genetic engineering are powerful methods for enhancing natural phytoremediation capabilities, or for introducing new capabilities into plants.  Genes for phytoremediation may originate from a micro-organism or may be transferred from one plant to another variety better adapted to the environmental conditions at the cleanup site. For example, genes encoding a nitroreductase from a bacterium were inserted into tobacco and showed faster removal of TNT and enhanced resistance to the toxic effects of TNT.
Researchers have also discovered a mechanism in plants that allows them to grow even when the pollution concentration in the soil is lethal for non-treated plants. Some natural, biodegradable compounds, such as exogenous polyamines, allow the plants to tolerate concentrations of pollutants 500 times higher than untreated plants, and to absorb more pollutants.

Hyperaccumulators and biotic interactions 
A plant is said to be a hyperaccumulator if it can concentrate the pollutants in a minimum percentage which varies according to the pollutant involved (for example: more than 1000 mg/kg of dry weight for nickel, copper, cobalt, chromium or lead; or more than 10,000 mg/kg for zinc or manganese).  This capacity for accumulation is due to hypertolerance, or phytotolerance: the result of adaptative evolution from the plants to hostile environments through many generations. A number of interactions may be affected by metal hyperaccumulation, including protection, interferences with neighbour plants of different species, mutualism (including mycorrhizae, pollen and seed dispersal), commensalism, and biofilm.

Tables of hyperaccumulators

Hyperaccumulators table – 1 : Al, Ag, As, Be, Cr, Cu, Mn, Hg, Mo, Naphthalene, Pb, Pd, Pt, Se, Zn
Hyperaccumulators table – 2 : Nickel
Hyperaccumulators table – 3 : Radionuclides (Cd, Cs, Co, Pu, Ra, Sr, U), Hydrocarbons, Organic Solvents.

Phytoscreening 
As plants are able to translocate and accumulate particular types of contaminants, plants can be used as biosensors of subsurface contamination, thereby allowing investigators to quickly delineate contaminant plumes. Chlorinated solvents, such as trichloroethylene, have been observed in tree trunks at concentrations related to groundwater concentrations. To ease field implementation of phytoscreening, standard methods have been developed to extract a section of the tree trunk for later laboratory analysis, often by using an increment borer. Phytoscreening may lead to more optimized site investigations and reduce contaminated site cleanup costs.

See also

 Bioaugmentation
 Biodegradation
 Bioremediation
 Constructed wetland
 Mycorrhizal bioremediation
 Mycoremediation
 Phytotreatment

References

Bibliography
 "Phytoremediation Website" — Includes reviews, conference announcements, lists of companies doing phytoremediation, and bibliographies. 
 "An Overview of Phytoremediation of Lead and Mercury" June 6 2000. The Hazardous Waste Clean-Up Information Web Site.
 "Enhanced phytoextraction of arsenic from contaminated soil using sunflower" September 22 2004. U.S. Environmental Protection Agency.
 "Phytoextraction", February 2000. Brookhaven National Laboratory 2000.
 "Phytoextraction of Metals from Contaminated Soil" April 18, 2001. M.M. Lasat
 July 2002. Donald Bren School of Environment Science & Management.
 "Phytoremediation" October 1997. Department of Civil Environmental Engineering. 
 "Phytoremediation" June 2001, Todd Zynda.
 "Phytoremediation of Lead in Residential Soils in Dorchester, MA" May, 2002. Amy Donovan Palmer, Boston Public Health Commission.
 "Technology Profile: Phytoextraction" 1997. Environmental Business Association.

 
 
 
 "Ancona V, Barra Caracciolo A, Campanale C, De Caprariis B, Grenni P, Uricchio VF, Borello D, 2019. Gasification Treatment of Poplar Biomass Produced in a Contaminated Area Restored using Plant Assisted Bioremediation. Journal of Environmental Management"

External links

Missouri Botanical Garden (host): Phytoremediation website  — Review Articles, Conferences, Phytoremediation Links, Research Sponsors, Books and Journals, and Recent Research.
International Journal of Phytoremediation — devoted to the publication of current laboratory and field research describing the use of plant systems to remediate contaminated environments.
Using Plants To Clean Up Soils — from Agricultural Research magazine
New Alchemy Institute  — co-founded by John Todd (Canadian biologist)

Bioremediation
 
Environmental soil science
Environmental engineering
Environmental terminology
Pollution control technologies
Conservation projects
Ecological restoration
Soil contamination
Biotechnology
Sustainable technologies